David Morgan Jones  (28 December 1874 – 19 September 1950) was Archdeacon of Carmarthen from 1938 until 1949.

Pugh was educated at Llandovery College, St David's College, Lampeter, and St. Michael's College, Llandaff, and ordained in 1900. After curacies in Llangyfelach and Swansea he held incumbencies in Aberporth, Cardigan, Llanelly and Llanddowror.

References

1874 births
1950 deaths
People educated at Llandovery College
Alumni of the University of Wales, Lampeter
Alumni of St Michael's College, Llandaff
Archdeacons of Carmarthen